Double Solitaire is a two-player variant on the best-known patience or solitaire card game called Klondike.  While it is mostly referred to as Double Solitaire, it is sometimes called Double Klondike (a name which also doubles as an alternate designation of the single-player solitaire game Gargantua).  Games with more players (Triple Solitaire, Quadruple Solitaire, etc.) are also possible.

As the name suggests, Double Klondike is a two-player game, and is played with two full packs of playing cards, minus the Jokers; for the purpose of Double Klondike, the cards should be of the same size, but each pack's cards should be distinguishable from the other packs in some way, such as a different font style on the cards' faces or different backing designs for each pack.

How to play
Seated facing one another, each player sets up a typical Klondike layout, with one difference: the two players share a communal foundation area in the space between the two layouts. The communal foundation will have eight potential stacks, two for each pair of suits from the two decks.

Each person plays their own layout as per Klondike rules, but with three-turn and unlimited-pass options applying to both players. Foundations are started and built up by suit as usual, except that there are two potential stacks for each suit. Players may build up on any foundation stack of the correct suit, whether or not that player started the stack or which player's cards are in the stack. Players may need to move fast when starting a new stack in order to build on it; for example, if both players have a Two of Hearts available to play, one player who is about to begin a foundation stack with the Ace of Hearts would need to act quickly to place the Ace and then place his Two before the other player places her Two first. Thus, a foundation stack might have any combination of both players' cards. The game is over when both players have no legal moves left. The cards in the foundation stacks are then sorted according by deck of origin, and the number of cards from each deck are counted. The winner of the game is the player with the highest number of cards in the foundation stacks at the end of the game.

A number of informal playing conditions are usually agreed for competitive play:
Players must hold the deck in one hand and use the other hand to make all moves, making it harder to add two consecutive cards to a foundation stack unchallenged.
Cards must be placed on to foundation stacks one at a time, and no 'throwing' of cards is permitted
If two or more players try to place a card on the same foundation stack then the first card to be so placed wins and losing players have to take their card back.
Players may not move partial stacks (so a sequence of red eight, black seven, red six can be moved onto a black nine, but the red six cannot be moved by itself onto another black seven).

Variations
Russian Bank, also called Crapette, is a two player game that is a more complex derivative of Double Solitaire.  

Versions of Russian Bank have been produced commercially by Mattel and Hasbro under the names Skip-Bo and Spite and Malice.

References

See also
 Klondike
 Gargantua
 List of solitaires
 Glossary of solitaire

Double-deck patience card games
Competitive patience card games
Two-player card games